The year 1600 in music involved some significant events.

Events 
 Start of Artusi–Monteverdi controversy, with publication of Artusi's treatise, L'Artusi Ovvero delle Imperfettioni della moderna musica.

Publications 
Agostino Agazzari – First book of madrigals for five voices (Venice: Angelo Gardano)
Giovanni Francesco Anerio –  (Rome: Simone Verovio)
Giammateo Asola
 for two voices (Venice: Ricciardo Amadino)
 for eight voices (Venice: Ricciardo Amadino)
Adriano Banchieri –  (Milan: Giovanni Francesco Besozzi & Co.), the third book of canzonettas for three voices
Valerio Bona –  (Psalms for all Vespers for the whole year) (Venice: Giacomo Vincenti)
Giulio Caccini –  (Florence: Giorgio Marescotti), not premiered until 1602
Christoph Demantius –  for six voices (Nuremberg: Catharina Dieterich)
John Dowland – The Second Booke of Songs or Ayres of 2, 4. and 5. parts, including Flow my Tears (London: Thomas East for Thomas Morley)
Giovanni Dragoni – First book of motets for five voices (Rome: Nicolo Mutii), published posthumously
Johannes Eccard
  for five voices (Königsberg: Georg Osterberger), a wedding song
 for five voices (Königsberg: Georg Osterberger), a wedding song
Thomas Elsbeth –  for six voices (Frankfurt an der Oder: Friedrich Hartmann)
Christian Erbach –  for four, five, six, seven, eight, and more voices (Augsburg: Johannes Praetorius)
Bartholomäus Gesius –  (Frankfurt an der Oder: Friedrich Hartmann), a collection of antiphons, responsories, hymns, introits and other mass music
Jakob Hassler – Madrigals for six voices (Nuremberg: Paul Kaffmann)
Orlande de Lassus –  for four voices (Munich: Nicolaus Heinrich), published posthumously
Tiburtio Massaino – First book of masses for eight voices (Venice: Ricciardo Amadino)
Simone Molinaro – Second book of canzonettas for three voices (Venice: Ricciardo Amadino)
Philippe de Monte
Seventh book of motets for five voices (Venice: Angelo Gardano)
 for six voices (Venice: Angelo Gardano), a collection of canzoni and madrigals
Thomas Morley – The first booke of ayres (London: William Barley)
Giovanni Pierluigi da Palestrina (posthumous publications)
Tenth book of masses
Eleventh book of masses

Benedetto Pallavicino — Sixth book of madrigals for five voices (Venice: Angelo Gardano)
Orfeo Vecchi
 (Hymns for the whole year) for five voices (Milan: heirs of Simon Tini & Giovanni Francesco Besozzi)
 for four, five, and eight voices (Milan: heirs of Simon Tini & Giovanni Francesco Besozzi), a collection of canticles, hymns, and litanies
Thomas Weelkes – Madrigals Of 5. and 6. parts, apt for the Viols and voices

Classical music 
 Emilio de' Cavalieri – , the first oratorio (produced in Rome in February)

Opera 
 Giulio Caccini – , premièred October 8
 Jacopo Peri – Euridice (believed to be the earliest work of modern opera surviving to the present day), produced by Emilio de' Cavalieri for the wedding of Henry IV of France and Maria de' Medici in Florence, premièred October 6

Births 
date unknown
Carlo Farina, Italian violinist and composer (died 1639)
Pietro Paolo Sabbatini, composer and conductor (died 1657)
probable – Etienne Moulinié, French composer (died 1669)

Deaths 
April – Thomas Deloney, balladeer (b. 1543)
September – Claude Le Jeune, French composer
November 25 – Ginés Pérez de la Parra, composer (b. c. 1548)

 
16th century in music
Music by year